Almanach 1999-2000 is a 1999 Canadian documentary film by Quebec film director Denys Desjardins produced by the National Film Board of Canada (NFB).

Synopsis
At the brink of year 2000, a time when Nostradamus and other prophets predicted doomsday, a cosmic meltdown, Almanach 1999-2000 takes a humorous look at the world of divination. A fascinating trip to the very heart of the strange, this film opens up the spheres of the paranormal, giving us an opportunity to discover an entire gallery of colourful personalities (psychic, astrologist, prophet, sceptic, philosopher, grower, etc.) who manage to cast doubt on our entire relationship with the future.

Cast
 Jocelyne Blouin
 Alain Bonnier
 Robert Ducharme
 Hauris Lalancette
 Denis Ménard
 Michel Morin
 Bernard Simon Nagy
 Maurice Poulin
 Jacques Sénécal
 Benoît Villeneuve

See also
List of films featuring eclipses

External links
Web site
NFB Web site

1999 films
Canadian documentary films
National Film Board of Canada documentaries
Films directed by Denys Desjardins
1999 documentary films
Documentary films about the paranormal
French-language Canadian films
1990s Canadian films